West Goshen can refer to:

West Goshen, California
West Goshen, Connecticut
West Goshen Township, Chester County, Pennsylvania

es:West Goshen